The Tanzania Labour Party (TLP) is a political party in Tanzania.

Electoral performance
At the 2000 legislative elections, the party won 3 out of 269 seats in the National Assembly. In the presidential elections of the same day, its candidate Augustine Lyatonga Mrema won 7.8% of the vote. 

In elections held on 14 December 2005, TLP presidential candidate Augustine Mrema placed fourth out of ten candidates, winning 0.75% of the vote. The party won one seat in National Assembly elections held on the same day.

References

1992 establishments in Tanzania
Labour parties
Political parties established in 1992
Political parties in Tanzania
Social democratic parties in Africa
Socialist parties in Tanzania